Syed Zafar Ali Shah is a Pakistani politician who has been member of the Senate of Pakistan, the National Assembly of Pakistan and the Provincial Assembly of the Punjab.

Political career

He was elected to the National Assembly of Pakistan from NA-48 on PML-N ticket in 1997 general election.

He ran for the seat of National Assembly on PML-N ticket in 2002 general election but was unsuccessful.

He was elected to the Senate of Pakistan in 2009 where he served until 2015.

In 2015, he ran for the chairmanship  in local body elections in Islamabad but was unsuccessful.

In 2018, he joined Pakistan Tehreek-e-Insaf.

References

Members of the Senate of Pakistan
Pakistani MNAs 1997–1999
Members of the Provincial Assembly of the Punjab
Politicians from Rawalpindi
1943 births
Living people
Punjabi people
Pakistan Muslim League (N) MNAs